Paremhat 30 - Coptic Calendar - Parmouti 2

The first day of the Coptic month of Parmouti, the eighth month of the Coptic year. In common years, this day corresponds to March 27, of the Julian Calendar, and April 9, of the Gregorian Calendar. This day falls in the Coptic Season of Shemu, the season of the Harvest.

Commemorations

Prophets 
 The departure of the Righteous Aaron the High-priest, brother of Moses the Arch-prophet

Saints 
 The departure of Saint Silvanus the Monk

Other commemorations 
 The raid of the Arabs of Upper Egypt on the Wilderness of Scetis

References 

Days of the Coptic calendar